Charles Édouard Marie Geynet (25 September 1867 – 14 March 1916) was a French sports shooter. He competed in the men's trap event at the 1900 Summer Olympics.

References

External links
 

1867 births
1916 deaths
French male sport shooters
Olympic shooters of France
Shooters at the 1900 Summer Olympics